Class 45 may refer to:

British Rail Class 45
DRG Class 45